Blessington Street Basin is a former drinking water reservoir in northern central Dublin which operated from 1810 until the 1970s, serving the north city. It became the central feature of a public park in 1891, and this park was renewed and reopened in 1994.

History
Dublin had one drinking water reservoir, the City Basin, at James' Street, constructed on high ground near the House of Industry on the south side of the city, from 1721.

Blessington Street Basin, a new city basin, to supply the northside of the city, was constructed by Dublin Corporation beginning about 1803, and finished in 1810.  The facility was opened as the Royal George Reservoir, named in honour of King George III. 

The water came from the Broadstone line of the Royal Canal, and so ultimately from Lough Owel in County Westmeath. It came by pipe into the basin at the western end of the Blessington Street. 

From its construction, the area around the reservoir was used as a park, but it was formally developed as a public park in 1891.  The park project was supervised by architect Spencer Harty, and including the construction of brick walls and a lodge for a park warden. 

By 1869, the basin was not large enough for purpose, and water collection moved outside the city. The basin continued to serve the Jameson's and Powers' distilleries until the 1970s, and then went out of operation as a reservoir. There were worries about the stagnant water creating a typhoid outbreak in the late 1800s leading the city corporation to consider filling in the basin and the stretch of water connecting the basin to the canal; this connection was finally filled in 1956.

An artificial island was constructed in the basin to provide a home for birds.

Refurbishment
In 1993 work began on the restoration of the site following a rejected proposal to extensively refurbish it in 1991. The refurbishment was carried out by the Dublin City Council aided by FÁS, and with financial support from the National Heritage Council and A.L.O.N.E. It was reopened as a park on 4 November 1994.

Structure
The basin is rectangular, about 120 m long and 60 m wide, and holds about 4 million gallons (15.1 million litres) of water.

The site also includes a lodge house built in a Tudor style in 1811, and another modern council building.

Nature
Since its restoration, the basin now serves as a bird habitat, with an artificial island and a number of fish. Amongst the birds that can be seen there are swans, tufted ducks, chaffinches, mallards and pigeons.

In fiction 
The Basin is one of the locations featured in the book, The Coroner's Daughter by Andrew Hughes, which was selected as the Dublin UNESCO City of Literature One City One Book for 2023. There is a passing mention of the basin in James Joyce's Ulysses also.

See also
Blessington, County Wicklow

References

Buildings and structures in County Dublin
Reservoirs in the Republic of Ireland